No Heavy Petting is the fifth studio album by English rock band UFO, released in 1976. It is the first UFO album to feature a full-time keyboard player as a member of the band, making this their first record as a five-piece band. While keyboardist Danny Peyronel only stayed in the band for this one album, he did co-write several tracks on the record.

In 1994, a CD including this album and Lights Out was released by BGO Records. Like many CDs in the UFO catalogue, it was remastered and reissued with bonus tracks in 2007.

No Heavy Petting was a rule posted in many public baths in England during the 1970s and 1980s.

Track listing

All previously unreleased studio tracks were recorded at Morgan Studios in January 1976 except "All or Nothing" on September 15, 1975 and mixed at Abbey Road Studios in June 2007.

Personnel
UFO
Phil Mogg – vocals
Andy Parker – drums
Pete Way – bass
Michael Schenker – guitar
Danny Peyronel – keyboards, backing vocals

Production
Leo Lyons – producer
Mike Bobak – engineer
Hipgnosis – cover art

Charts

References

UFO (band) albums
1976 albums
Albums with cover art by Hipgnosis
Albums produced by Leo Lyons
Chrysalis Records albums
Albums recorded at Morgan Sound Studios